Heterospathe is a monoecious genus of flowering plant in the palm family found in Oceania, where it is called sagisi palm. With 39 species, Heterospathe is named from a Greek combination of "various" and "spathe", which describes the two distinct bract types.

Description
They exhibit considerable variation in morphology and habit; the slender trunks may be solitary or sparsely to densely clustering, some are miniatures and perpetual undergrowth subjects while others contribute to the canopy top.  The trunks are ringed by leaf scars and end in a poorly defined or absent crownshaft.  The leaves are usually pinnate, rarely bifid, from small to large, and frequently red colored when new.

The inflorescence is interfoliar but will hang pendent nearing antithesis.  It may be branched from one to four orders with short white to yellow branches of spirally arranged, male and female flowers.  Ellipsoidal to spherical, the fruit ripen to various shades of orange and red and contain a single seed.

Distribution and habitat
Heterospathe species are relatively widespread across the Pacific's western edges with several in New Guinea, the Philippines, the Solomon Islands, eastern Indonesia and Micronesia.  Across this range they inhabit montane and lowland rain forest, in some cases receiving total shade or filtered light while others mature into full sun with age; H. delicatula and H. humilis are found at high elevations in New Guinea's mountains.  Being rain forest dwellers they are typically found in humus-rich soil.

Species
 Heterospathe annectens H.E.Moore - New Guinea
 Heterospathe arfakiana (Becc.) H.E.Moore - New Guinea
 Heterospathe barfodii L.M.Gardiner & W.J.Baker - Papua
 Heterospathe brevicaulis Fernando - Luzon
 Heterospathe cagayanensis Becc. - Luzon
 Heterospathe califrons Fernando - Philippines
 Heterospathe clemensiae (Burret) H.E.Moore - New Guinea
 Heterospathe compsoclada (Burret) Heatubun - New Guinea
 Heterospathe delicatula H.E.Moore - New Guinea
 Heterospathe dransfieldii Fernando - Palawan
 Heterospathe elata Scheff - Philippines, Maluku, New Guinea, Micronesia
 Heterospathe elegans (Becc.) Becc. - New Guinea
 Heterospathe elmeri Becc. - Philippines
 Heterospathe glabra (Burret) H.E.Moore - New Guinea
 Heterospathe glauca (Scheff.) H.E.Moore - Maluku
 Heterospathe intermedia (Becc.) Fernando - Philippines
 Heterospathe kajewskii Burret - Solomon Islands
 Heterospathe ledermanniana Becc. - New Guinea
 Heterospathe lepidota H.E.Moore - New Guinea
 Heterospathe longipes (H.E.Moore) Norup - Fiji
 Heterospathe macgregorii (Becc.) H.E.Moore - New Guinea
 Heterospathe minor Burret - Solomon Islands
 Heterospathe muelleriana (Becc.) Becc. - New Guinea
 Heterospathe negrosensis Becc. - Philippines
 Heterospathe obriensis (Becc.) H.E.Moore - New Guinea
 Heterospathe parviflora Essig - Bismarck Archipelago
 Heterospathe philippinensis (Becc.) Becc. - Philippines
 Heterospathe phillipsii D.Fuller & Dowe - Fiji
 Heterospathe pilosa (Burret) Burret - New Guinea
 Heterospathe porcata W.J.Baker & Heatubun - Western New Guinea
 Heterospathe pulchra H.E.Moore - Papua New Guinea
 Heterospathe pullenii M.S.Trudgen & W.J.Baker - Papua New Guinea
 Heterospathe ramulosa Burret - Solomon Islands
 Heterospathe salomonensis Becc. - Solomon Islands
 Heterospathe scitula Fernando - Luzon
 Heterospathe sensisi Becc. - Solomon Islands
 Heterospathe sibuyanensis Becc. - Sibuyan
 Heterospathe sphaerocarpa Burret - New Guinea
 Heterospathe trispatha Fernando - Luzon
 Heterospathe uniformis Dowe - Vanuatu
 Heterospathe woodfordiana Becc. - Solomon Islands

Cultivation and uses 
The colorful new foliage has increased their popularity in Australia though they are still uncommon there and more so in the United States where only one species is cultivated with any regularity.  In any case, they naturally prefer surroundings resembling those in their range, particularly acidic soil which is fast-draining, copious water and protection from cold.  The petioles and leaflets are woven and thatched, the palm heart is reportedly eaten, and fruit from H. elata is chewed as a betel substitute.

References

External links 
 Heterospathe on NPGS/GRIN
 Fairchild Images
 Fairchild Guide to Palms
 GBIF portal

Areceae
Arecaceae genera